Egan Adams (born June 15, 1959) is a former professional tennis player from the United States.

Biography
Adams, a native of Miami, went to Archbishop Curley-Notre Dame High School, before competing professionally in the 1980s.

His best result on the Grand Prix circuit was reaching the doubles final of the 1982 Quito Open, with Rocky Royer. In 1982 he also made his first US Open main draw appearance, a first round loss to Mark Edmondson, as well as the quarter-finals in Brazil, his best singles performance in a Grand Prix tournament.

At the 1985 French Open he featured in both the singles and men's doubles event. He lost to Andrei Chesnokov in the opening round of the singles and in the doubles he and partner Stanislav Birner had to face second seeds Ken Flach and Robert Seguso. He also played at the 1985 US Open, in the men's doubles with Mark Wooldridge.

Adams won two Challenger titles in doubles, the second in Lagos in 1985. The title in Lagos came in the same month that he won a match against a young Thomas Muster in another Nigerian Challenger tournament.

He was a highly ranked player on the ITF senior's tour for many years.

Grand Prix career finals

Doubles: 1 (0–1)

Challenger titles

Doubles: (2)

References

External links
 
 

1959 births
Living people
American male tennis players
Tennis people from Florida
Sportspeople from Miami-Dade County, Florida